The Notre Dame Fighting Irish men's ice hockey team is the college ice hockey team of the University of Notre Dame, competing at the NCAA Division I level as an associate member of the Big Ten Conference. The Irish play their home games at Compton Family Ice Arena. The head coach of the Fighting Irish is Jeff Jackson, and his assistant coaches are Paul Pooley, Andy Slaggert, and Max Mobley.

Conference history
Prior to the 2013–14 season, the team competed in the Central Collegiate Hockey Association, and also won its last ever conference championship. In the 2013–2014 season, the team began to play in the Hockey East conference, where it played until the conclusion of the 2016-2017 season. Beginning in the 2017–2018 season, the team joined the Big Ten Conference.

History
Ice hockey has existed on and off as both a club and varsity sport at Notre Dame since 1912. The modern era of Notre Dame hockey began in 1968, when the Fighting Irish began to play as a Division I independent. In 1971, the team joined its first conference, the Western Collegiate Hockey Association (WCHA). The team continued playing in the WCHA for a decade until moving to the Central Collegiate Hockey Association (CCHA) with the conference's three Michigan schools in 1981.

The Fighting Irish lasted only two years in the new CCHA, when ice hockey was downgraded to a club sport for the 1983–1984 season.  During that season, the Fighting Irish played in the Central States Collegiate Hockey League (CSCHL). Notre Dame finished that season second in the CSCHL with a record of 13–2–0. In 1984–1985 Notre Dame Hockey was once again elevated to varsity status with the team playing as a Division I independent.  In 1992 Notre Dame rejoined the CCHA. The Irish struggled to remain competitive in the CCHA, but began to improve under head coach Dave Poulin.  In 2004, Poulin led the team to its first ever NCAA Tournament.  However, the following season was dramatically different.  They only won five games, the worst season in school history. Poulin resigned after the season.

Jeff Jackson era

In 2005, Jeff Jackson took over as head coach. Jackson, who had already won two national championships at Lake Superior State University, had an immediate impact at Notre Dame. In his first season with the Irish, the team greatly improved upon the five-win season, boosting its record to 13–19–5. 2007 was even more successful. The Irish achieved their first ever number one ranking in both the Uscho.com and USA Today Polls and their first number one seeding for the NCAA Tournament. The following year, the Irish finished fourth in both the CCHA's regular season and playoffs, and again made the NCAA Tournament.  Once there, the Irish went on to beat top-seeded New Hampshire 7–3 and third-seeded Michigan State 3–1 to advance to the Frozen Four for the first time in school history.  From there, they defeated first-seeded Michigan in overtime to advance to the national title game, ultimately losing to Boston College 4–1. Notre Dame also became the first four-seed to advance to the national semi-finals, and eventually to the national title game since the new 16-team format was introduced in 2003. In the 2008–2009 season, the Irish added another CCHA regular season title and a CCHA Tournament title, defeating Michigan 5–2 in the title game. Notre Dame advanced to the 2009 NCAA Tournament where the Irish was upset by 16th seeded Bemidji State 1–5.

The following season, Notre Dame finished with a record of 13–17–8 and ended the season after being swept by Ohio State two games to none in the three game opening round series of the CCHA Playoffs. The Irish rebounded in the 2010–11 regular season at 23–13–5, and clinched their second trip to the Frozen Four in program history by defeating New Hampshire 2–1 in the Northeast Regional Final. The Fighting Irish faced the East Regional Champion Minnesota-Duluth in the national semi-finals. The Irish fell to the eventual national champion 3–4.

In October 2011, Notre Dame announced the team will join Hockey East starting in the 2013–14 season, in response to the conference realignment. The university also announced an expanded television broadcast deal with NBC. The Fighting Irish Hockey began the 2011–12 season in the Edmund P. Joyce Center and played the last hockey game at the Joyce Center on October 15, 2011 against Ohio State. The team opened the university's new 5,000-seat Compton Family Ice Arena on October 21, 2011 against Rensselaer. Following the move into the new arena the Irish improved to a 7–3 home record in the new facility that included wins over future Hockey East rivals, Boston University, ranked 3th in the NCAA, Boston College, ranked 4th, and 8th ranked Western Michigan. On January 4, 2012, former coach and long-time Notre Dame Athletic Department employee, Charles "Lefty" Smith died. Smith coached the team from 1968 to 1987 as the first varsity ice hockey after helping the program transition from club to varsity status. Following his coaching career, he continued at Notre Dame in the athletic department until retiring just three days before his death. The Fighting Irish finished the regular season with an overall record of 17–16–3 and a conference record of 12–13–3. The team defeated Ohio State in the opening round of the 2012 CCHA Tournament, sweeping the Buckeyes in two games by scores of 2–0 and 4–2. In the second round of the CCHA Tournament, the team was defeated by the Michigan Wolverines in two games in a series that saw the first game go into a double overtime. The team was defeated in the first round of the NCAA regional playoffs in 2013 and 2014, both times by the St. Cloud State Huskies.

Season-by-season results

Source:

Head coaches

All-time coaching records
As of completion of 2021–22 season

† The Program was dropped to club status for the 1983–84 season.

Postseason

NCAA Tournament Results
The Fighting Irish have appeared in the NCAA Tournament 13 times.

Statistical leaders
Source:

Career points leaders

Career goaltending leaders

GP = Games played; Min = Minutes played; W = Wins; L = Losses; T = Ties; GA = Goals against; SO = Shutouts; SV% = Save percentage; GAA = Goals against average

minimum 30 games played

Statistics current through the start of the 2019–20 season.

Players

Current roster
As of August 25, 2022.

Awards and honors

United States Hockey Hall of Fame
Source:

Bill Nyrop (1997)

NCAA

Individual awards

Spencer Penrose Award
Jeff Jackson: 2007, 2018

Tim Taylor Award
T. J. Tynan: 2011

Mike Richter Award
Cale Morris: 2018

All-Americans
AHCA First Team All-Americans

1972-73: Bill Nyrop, D; Eddie Bumbacco, F
1975-76: Jack Brownschidle, D
1976-77: Jack Brownschidle, D; Brian Walsh, F
1979-80: Greg Meredith, F
1982-83: Kirt Bjork, F
2006-07: David Brown, G
2008-09: Ian Cole, D
2017-18: Cale Morris, G

AHCA Second Team All-Americans

1998-99: Benoit Cotnoir, D
2008-09: Erik Condra, F
2013-14: Anders Lee, F
2014-15: Robbie Russo, D
2016-17: Anders Bjork, F
2018-19: Bobby Nardella, D

WCHA

Individual awards

Most Valuable Player
Brian Walsh: 1977

Freshman of the Year
Brian Walsh: 1974

Coach of the Year
Lefty Smith: 1973

All-Conference Teams
First Team All-WCHA

1972–73: Eddie Bumbacco, F
1975–76: Jack Brownschidle, D
1976-77: Jack Brownschidle, D; Brian Walsh, F
1979-80: Greg Meredith, F

Second Team All-WCHA

1972–73: Bill Nyrop, D; Ian Williams, F
1973–74: Ray Delorenzi, F
1976–77: John Peterson, G

CCHA

Individual awards

Player of the Year
David Brown: 2007

Rookie of the Year
Mark Eaton: 1998
T. J. Tynan: 2011

Best Defensive Defenseman
Kyle Lawson: 2009
Sean Lorenz: 2011

Best Goaltender
David Brown: 2007

Coach of the Year
Jeff Jackson: 2007, 2011

Scholar-Athlete of the Year
Cory McLean: 2005
Jordan Pearce: 2009

Terry Flanagan Memorial Award
Steve Noble: 1997
Dan VeNard: 2008
Erik Condra: 2009
Joe Rogers: 2013

Ilitch Humanitarian Award
Neil Komadoski: 2004

Tournament Most Valuable Player
David Brown: 2007
Jordan Pearce: 2009
T. J. Tynan: 2013

All-Conference Teams
First Team All-CCHA

1998–99: Benoit Cotnoir, D
2006–07: David Brown, G
2008–09: Ian Cole, D
2011–12: T. J. Tynan, F
2011–12: Anders Lee, F

Second Team All-CCHA

1981–82: John Schmidt, D; Dave Poulin, F
1982–83: Kirt Bjork, F
1998–99: Ben Simon, F
2003–04: Brett Lebda, D; Aaron Gill, F; Rob Globke, F
2008–09: Kyle Lawson, D; Erik Condra, F; Christian Hanson, F
2010–11: T. J. Tynan, F; Anders Lee, F

CCHA All-Rookie Team

1992–93: Jamie Ling, F
1996–97: Joe Dusbabek, F
1997–98: Mark Eaton, D
1998–99: David Inman, F
2000–01: Brett Lebda, D
2005–06: Erik Condra, F
2006–07: Kyle Lawson, D; Kevin Deeth, F; Ryan Thang, F
2008–09: Billy Maday, F
2009–10: Mike Johnson, G
2010–11: T. J. Tynan, F; Anders Lee, F
2011–12: Robbie Russo, D
2012–13: Mario Lucia, F

Hockey East

Individual awards

Best Defensive Forward
Sam Herr: 2016

Best Defensive Defenseman
Dennis Gilbert: 2017

Three-Stars Award
Anders Bjork: 2017

All-Conference Teams
First Team All-Hockey East

2014–15: Robbie Russo, D; Vinnie Hinostroza, F
2016–17: Cal Petersen, G; Anders Bjork, F

Second Team All-Hockey East

2013–14: Stephen Johns, D
2015–16: Jordan Gross, D; Anders Bjork, F

Third Team All-Hockey East

2016–17: Dennis Gilbert, D

Hockey East All-Rookie Team

2013–14: Vinnie Hinostroza, F
2014–15: Cal Petersen, G
2015–16: Bobby Nardella, D
2016–17: Andrew Peeke, F

Big Ten

Individual awards

Player of the Year
Cale Morris: 2018

Goaltender of the Year
Cale Morris: 2018

Tournament Most Outstanding Player
Cale Morris: 2018, 2019

All-Conference Teams
First Team All-Big Ten

2017–18: Cale Morris, G; Jordan Gross, D; Jake Evans, F
2018–19: Bobby Nardella, D

Second Team All-Big Ten

2018–19: Cale Morris, G
2020–21: Spencer Stastney, D; Alex Steeves, F
2021–22: Max Ellis, F

Big Ten All-Freshman Team

2018–19: Michael Graham, F

Fighting Irish in the NHL
As of July 1, 2022.

WHA
Several players also were members of WHA teams.

Source:

Team captains

Terry Lorenz & Steve Noble, 1996–97
Steve Noble, 1997–98
Brian Urick, 1998–99
Ben Simon, 1999–2000
Ryan Dolder, 2000–01
Evan Nielsen, 2001–03
Aaron Gill, 2003–04
Cory McLean, 2004–05
T. J. Jindra, 2005–07
Mark Van Guilder, 2007–08
Erik Condra, 2008–09
Ryan Thang, 2009–10
Joe Lavin, 2010–11
Sean Lorenz & Billy Maday, 2011–12
Anders Lee, 2012–13
Jeff Costello, 2013–14
Steven Fogarty, 2014–15
Steven Fogarty & Robbie Russo, 2015
Steven Fogarty, 2015–16
Cal Petersen, 2016–17
Jake Evans, 2017–18
Andrew Peeke, 2018–19

Compton Family Ice Arena

In February 2009, The University of Notre Dame announced it will begin construction on a new, freestanding, on-campus ice arena designed to meet the needs of both the Irish hockey team and the local community. Construction on the 5,022-seat arena began on March 15, 2010 with the venue opening in the Fall of 2011. The arena held its first Notre Dame hockey game on October 21, 2011 when a sellout crowd saw Notre Dame defeat Rensselaer 5–2.

The new ice arena is located south of the Joyce Center, just north of Edison Road, and just west of where the new Irish track and field facility is being constructed. The majority of the general public arena seating is of the chair-back variety with bleacher seating in the student section. The Compton Family Center replaced the rink inside the Edmund P. Joyce Center. During the time that the Irish played at the Joyce Center, the facility was the second smallest home rink in the CCHA with a hockey capacity of 2,857. All seats were benchers, and most of the seating consists of temporary bleachers. In 2007, the Irish compiled an impressive 14–2–2 home record at the Joyce Center.

References

External links
 

Big Ten Conference ice hockey
 
Ice hockey teams in Indiana